The Zimbabwean dollar (sign: Z$; code: ZWL), also known as the Zimdollar or Real Time Gross Settlement (RTGS) dollar, is one of the official currencies of Zimbabwe. It was the only official currency in Zimbabwe from June 2019 to March 2020, after which foreign currencies were legalised again.

History

Background

On 29 January 2009, the Zimbabwean government legalised the use of foreign currencies, such as the United States dollar and the South African rand: in response, Zimbabweans quickly abandoned the old Zimbabwean dollar, which was collapsing from what was at the time the second highest rate of hyperinflation (after the Hungarian pengő in 1946). On 12 April 2009, the power-sharing government of then-Prime Minister Morgan Tsvangirai suspended the old dollar, and the Reserve Bank of Zimbabwe demonetised the last banknotes of the old dollar, on 30 September 2015.

The multi-currency system eventually resulted in a liquidity crisis, because Zimbabwe had to import more than what they could export, resulting in a net exodus of US dollars: eventually, the Reserve Bank introduced a series of bond coins on 18 December 2014, and bond notes on 28 November 2016, after securing a total of US$250 million in loans from the African Export-Import Bank.

Although bond money was officially interchangeable at par with the US dollar, the general public quickly resisted them as an attempt to reintroduce the Zimbabwean dollar, which gained a bad reputation due to hyperinflation. That, along with the continued shortage of US dollars in Zimbabwe, resulted in a thriving parallel exchange rate that ranged between $3.00 and $3.80 in bond money to the US dollar, in February 2019.

Introduction of the fifth dollar

The parallel rate and the continued shortage of US dollars created a situation where the Reserve Bank could no longer maintain the peg with the US dollar: the Reserve Bank also wanted to end the system of different exchange rates, which resulted in customers paying more or less depending on the payment method. On 20 February 2019, Reserve Bank governor John Mangudya announced the introduction of the current Zimbabwean dollar, initially called the Real Time Gross Settlement dollar (RTGS dollar). The RTGS dollar, which started trading on 25 February, consisted of real-time gross settlement balances (hence the name), and existing bond notes and bond coins (both of which were devalued by 60% to Z$2.50 per US dollar).

On 24 June 2019, the Zimbabwean government renamed the RTGS dollar to the Zimbabwean dollar, and banned the use of foreign currencies in an attempt to end the multi-currency system: the BBC reported widespread opposition to the ban, partly due to continued public distrust, partly due to high inflation, and partly due to traders still having to use hard currencies to import goods from abroad. The onset of the coronavirus pandemic eventually forced the Reserve Bank to reinstate the multi-currency system, on 29 March 2020.

On 29 October 2019, the Reserve Bank claimed that a new currency would replace the fifth dollar. This claim turned out to be a new $2 bond coin, and revised $2 and $5 banknotes without the "bond note" inscription: both entered circulation on 11 November 2019. The Reserve Bank continues to introduce higher value banknotes, with the $100 note entering circulation on 5 April 2022.

Continued high inflation

The fifth Zimbabwean dollar continues to experience very high inflation, due to continued public distrust, and the continued shortage of hard currency as a result of importers being unable to use Zimbabwean dollars: almost immediately after the Reserve Bank abolished the peg, the official rate to the US dollar declined to Z$2.80 on 22 March, and Z$6.00 on 12 June 2019, while the parallel rate fluctuated between Z$7.00 and Z$13.00 by 3 July. The Reserve Bank's annual inflation rate surpassed 100% in June 2019, and 500% in December 2019. , the Reserve Bank annual inflation rate was 243.76%: the highest (since February 2019) was 837.53% in July 2020, and the lowest was 50.25% in August 2021.

Banknotes 

Zimbabwean banknotes that entered circulation since 2016 have the signature of John Mangudya, who succeeded Charity Dhliwayo as the governor of the Reserve Bank of Zimbabwe on 1 May 2014.

In 2022, the Reserve Bank started the process of removing $2 and $5 banknotes from circulation, due to long-term high inflation: on 5 April 2022, the official exchange rate for those banknotes were 1.4 and 3.5 US cents, respectively.

Bond notes 

The $2 and $5 bond notes entered circulation on 28 November 2016 and 3 February 2017, respectively.

2019–present series 

On 11 November 2019, the Reserve Bank issued regular banknotes for the first time since 2009, with commercial banks releasing them to the general public on the following day: the regular $2 and $5 banknotes are identical to the bond notes, but they do not have the "bond note" inscription on either side. $10 and $20 notes entered circulation on 19 May and 1 June 2020, respectively.

The $50 note entered circulation on 6 July 2021, and became the first Zimbabwean banknote since the withdrawal of the Rhodesian pound in 1970 to feature a person: a portrait of Mbuya Nehanda, a significant figure of Zimbabwean nationalism, appears on reverse with the Tomb of the Unknown Soldier at the National Heroes Acre. This was followed by the $100 banknote on 5 April 2022, which featured the ruins of Great Zimbabwe.

Relationship with foreign currencies 
When the RTGS Dollar was introduced in February 2019, Zimbabweans used a mix of foreign currencies including the US dollar, the South African rand, and the Chinese yuan. On 24 June 2019, the Zimbabwean government banned the use of foreign currencies in local transactions. However, high inflation, continued public resistance to the Zimbabwean dollar, and the worsening coronavirus pandemic forced the government to allow Zimbabweans to use foreign currencies again, in March 2020. The government has said that the authorization to use US dollars in local transactions is just temporary, but by June 2020, some Zimbabwean civil service personnel were already demanding payment of their salaries in US dollars, due to hyperinflation in the Zimdollar.

Exchange rates 

By March 2020, an attempt was made to peg the so-called Zimdollar at  = 25 RTGS$, but inflation continued and this effort was abandoned.

Annual inflation in the period ending July 2020 was 837.53% as reported by ZIMSTAT.

The exchange rate is determined by the forces of supply and demand on an auction market the Reserve Bank of Zimbabwe set up along with the announcement of the RTGS dollar. The market is called Interbank Foreign Currency Exchange Market and is made up of banks and bureaux de change.

A new weekly auction of foreign currency was set up in late June 2020 by the Reserve Bank of Zimbabwe to attempt to curb the rampant inflation which had driven the Zimdollar down to  = 80 Zimdollars. Inflation continued for the Zimdollar, and by May 2022, it was "officially quoted at 165.94 against the U.S. dollar while sliding continuously on the black market, where it is [was] currently trading between 330 and 400 to the US dollar." In an attempt to stop additional speculation in the Zimdollar, in May 2022, the Treasury ordered banks to stop lending, to be effective immediately.

In July 2022 the Reserve Bank of Zimbabwe announced the introduction of official gold coins into the market "as a store of value". The gold coins are called "Mosi-oa-Tunya", and they are expected to be sold for either Zimdollars or United States dollars at rates based upon the prevailing international price of gold plus the costs of production.

See also
Zimbabwean bond notes
Zimbabwean bond coins

Notes

References

External links 
 Reserve Bank of Zimbabwe Website
 February 2019 Monetary Policy

Currencies introduced in 2019
Currencies of Africa
Currencies of Zimbabwe
2019 establishments in Zimbabwe